Haemodorum brevisepalum is a shrub in the Haemodoraceae family, native to southwestern Western Australia.

It was first described in 1873 by George Bentham.

References

brevisepalum
Angiosperms of Western Australia
Taxa named by George Bentham
Plants described in 1873